This is a list of films produced by Tollywood (the Bengali language film industry in Kolkata) in 2006.

Highest-grossing
 MLA Fatakeshto

A-Z of films

References

External links
 Box Office Bengal
 Tollywood films of 2006 at the Internet Movie Database

2006
Lists of 2006 films by country or language
2006 in Indian cinema